Richard Fraser is a Canadian wheelchair curler.

Teams

References

External links 

Living people
Canadian male curlers
Canadian wheelchair curlers
Year of birth missing (living people)